Joshua Eric Towers (born February 26, 1977) is a former right-handed professional baseball pitcher.

Professional career

Baltimore Orioles
Towers was drafted by the Baltimore Orioles in the 15th round of the 1996 Major League Baseball draft.  In , Towers made his major league debut, compiling eight wins and ten losses while posting an ERA of 4.49 in 140.1 innings.  Towers started  with three straight losses along with two no-decisions in his first five games, giving up eleven home runs during that span. He would finish the year in the Orioles minor-league system.

Toronto Blue Jays
Towers signed with the Blue Jays as a minor league free agent for the  season. Joining the team midway through the season, he would go on to have a very successful run, appearing in 14 games (eight starts). He would finish the year 8–1 with a 4.48 ERA.  Unusually, while with the Blue Jays Towers was assigned the uniform number 7.  This made him the only pitcher in the major leagues with a single-digit uniform number at that time, and the also first pitcher in Blue Jays history whose uniform number contained but a single digit.  Though several dozen pitchers had worn a single digit uniform number for a span of several games, Towers was the first to wear it regularly over the course of several seasons since pitcher Ben Chapman (a converted outfielder) wore number 5 for the Brooklyn Dodgers in 1944-45.

In , Towers became the Blue Jays' fifth starter, going a mediocre 9–9 with a 5.11 ERA in 21 games started.

In , after ace Roy Halladay's leg was broken by a line drive, Towers was arguably Toronto's most dependable pitcher. Stepping up when the Blue Jays starting rotation seemed impossibly thin , he would finish the season with 13 wins, tied for the club lead (along with rookie Gustavo Chacín), Towers set career bests with a 3.71 ERA, 33 games started, and 208.2 innings pitched.

Having been signed to a two-year, $5.2 million contract during the off-season as a reward for his impressive 2005 year, Towers started the new season 0–7, with an ERA of 10.09 in his first seven starts.

On May 14, Towers pitched a good game against the Tampa Bay Devil Rays, throwing eight innings and allowing just two earned runs, leading the Jays to an 8–3 victory. Towers would go on to lose his eighth game of the season against the Colorado Rockies. The next game was another one against the Devil Rays, but he would leave the game after just  innings completed, giving up four earned runs. On May 24, the Blue Jays demoted Towers to the Syracuse Chiefs.

Towers would be recalled from Triple-A on June 20, but his struggles continued, and he was once again demoted to Syracuse on June 27.

Following his poor 2006 season, Towers decided to train with teammate and fellow Las Vegas off-season resident Reed Johnson. Towers, along with John Thomson, Tomo Ohka, and Víctor Zambrano was one of the leading contenders to land one of two open spots in the Blue Jays rotation.

During spring training, Towers was dominant, with only one bad outing during the spring. On March 31, it was announced that Towers had won the final spot in the Blue Jays'  rotation to begin the season, although Blue Jays General Manager J. P. Ricciardi admitted that Towers would be "on a short leash".

On April 28, after his third loss of the season, to the Texas Rangers, where he surrendered 5 runs in 1 inning, he was demoted to the bullpen. Víctor Zambrano was promoted in his place.

On July 8, Josh Towers pitched eight shutout innings, including  innings of perfect ball and then watched the Blue Jays head into the all-star break on a high note with a 1–0 walk-off victory over the Cleveland Indians. Towers pitched no walks, three hits for the Jays.

During a game against the New York Yankees on August 7, 2007, Towers intentionally hit Alex Rodriguez with a pitch. Rodriguez approached the mound and the benches cleared. After Rodriguez took first, Towers heard Yankees first base coach Tony Peña "chirping" at him, which led to the benches clearing again. After the game, Towers called Pena a "quitter", referring to his resignation as the Kansas City Royals' manager in 2005, and said he is not in a position to run his mouth. Towers promptly surrendered two runs after the incident, lost the game and was moved, for the second time in the season, to the bullpen.

Colorado Rockies
On February 6, Towers signed a one-year contract with the Colorado Rockies. He spent four months with the Rockies' Triple-A affiliate, the Colorado Springs Sky Sox. On July 26, he made himself a footnote in the record books when, during the second inning, he surrendered seven RBI and two home runs to Ryan Roberts of the Oklahoma RedHawks.

Washington Nationals

After becoming a free agent, Towers signed a minor league contract with the Washington Nationals in January . He was released on May 5, 2009 after spending time with the Syracuse Chiefs.

New York Yankees
On May 10, 2009, he was signed to a minor league contract by the New York Yankees and sent to the Scranton/Wilkes-Barre Yankees.  On August 8, 2009 he was called and placed on the Yankees roster but was designated for assignment the following day to make room for newly acquired pitcher Chad Gaudin. Towers cleared waivers and was outrighted back to the Scranton/Wilkes-Barre Yankees.  On September 5, he was recalled to the Yankees. The following day he was called in to pitch in a relief appearance for the Yankees, and in doing so, became the 1,500th player to play in an official game for the franchise. He earned a World Series ring for his appearances with the club that season.

Los Angeles Dodgers
On December 11, 2009, Towers signed a minor league contract with the Los Angeles Dodgers. He was assigned to the Triple-A Albuquerque Isotopes to start the season. He made eight starts for the Isotopes and was 2-5 with an 8.05 ERA. He was released on May 20, 2010, one day after allowing nine runs and ten hits in the first two innings.

Guerreros de Oaxaca
He signed with Guerreros de Oaxaca in the Mexican Baseball League for 2011 and appeared in 4 games for them with a 7.94 ERA.

Camden Riversharks
After his release in Mexico he signed with the Independent Camden Riversharks.  With Camden, he posted a record of 5-6, with a 6.15 ERA.

On August 7, 2011, Towers announced his retirement from baseball.  Towers is currently the color commentator of the UNLV Rebels Baseball team.

References

External links

1977 births
Living people
Albuquerque Isotopes players
American expatriate baseball players in Canada
American expatriate baseball players in Mexico
Baltimore Orioles players
Baseball players from California
Bluefield Orioles players
Bowie Baysox players
Camden Riversharks players
Colorado Springs Sky Sox players
Delmarva Shorebirds players
Frederick Keys players
Guerreros de Oaxaca players
Major League Baseball pitchers
Mexican League baseball pitchers
New York Yankees players
Oxnard Condors baseball players
People from Port Hueneme, California
Rochester Red Wings players
Scranton/Wilkes-Barre Yankees players
Sportspeople from Oxnard, California
Sportspeople from Ventura County, California
Syracuse Chiefs players
Syracuse SkyChiefs players
Toronto Blue Jays players